Dona Xepa (English: The Penny Lady) is a Brazilian telenovela created and written by Gustavo Reiz and directed by Ivan Zettel. It premiered on May 21, 2013 and ended on September 24, 2013. It stars Ângela Leal, Thaís Fersoza, Arthur Aguiar, Rayana Carvalho, and Gabriel Gracindo.

Plot 
Dona Xepa is the story of a mother who does everything for her children. Without much education, Dona Xepa says everything wrong and it embarrasses her children Rosalia and Edison. The tradeswoman earned this nickname by distributing the leftovers in her tent to the poor. Abandoned by her husband Esmeraldino, Xepa supports her children by working hard. Rosalia is a lawyer, beautiful, ambitious, she hates the life she leads and will do everything she can to infiltrate the rich world. Edison is an architecture student and despite being ashamed of his mother at times, he can do nothing to harm her.

Cast 
 Ângela Leal as Carlota Losano Coelho 'Dona Xepa'
 Thaís Fersoza as Rosália Losano Coelho/Rosa Vieira Passarelli
 Arthur Aguiar as Édison Losano Coelho
 Rayana Carvalho as Lis Pantaleão
 Gabriel Gracindo as François Fontaine Castro
 Márcio Kieling as Victor Hugo Pantaleão
 Gabriela Durlo as Isabela Castro and Barros Pantaleão
 Pérola Faria as Yasmin Silva
 Luíza Tomé as Magnólia dos Santos Pantaleão 'Meg'
 Angelina Muniz as Pérola Castro and Barros
 Bia Montez as Matilda Batista
 Bemvindo Sequeira as Dorivaldo de Souza
 Robertha Portella as Dafne Batista 'Mulher Tutti-Frutti'
 Alexandre Barillari as Robério Escovão
 José Dumont as Esmeraldino Losano/Rubinato
 Maurício Mattar as Júlio César Pantaleão
 Giuseppe Oristanio as Deputado Feliciano Castro e Barros
 Emilio Dantas as Benito de Souza
 Marcela Muniz as Genuína Silva 'Geni'
 Manuela Duarte as Cintia Lopez
 Diego Montez as Ricardo Lopes Coutinho 'Rick'
 Manoelita Lustosa as Terezinha Cho
 Ítala Nandi as Catherine Fontaine
 Augusto Garcia as João da Graça 'Graxinha'
 Ana Clara Pintor as Gisele Batista da Graça
 Jennifer Setti as Inocência da Conceição 'Mulher Broa'
 Castrinho as Ângelo Lazarini
 Aracy Cardoso as Alda Motta
 Ana Zettel as Leydiane Maria 'Lady'
 Gustavo Moretzsohn as Professor Miro
 Raphael Montagner as Leandro
 Alessandra Loyola as Camila
 Aninha Melo as Fernanda
 Nanda Oliveira as Bruna
 Junior Vieira as Vinícius
 Juliana David as Sophia
 Yago Lopes as Alê
 Ana Carolina Rainha as Jezebel
 Jefferson Brasil as Tairone
 Ricardo Ferreira as Galeto
 João Garrel as Fuinha
 Antônio Rocha Filho as Amadeu
 Daniela Pessoa as Chiara

Ratings

References

External links 

2013 telenovelas
Brazilian telenovelas
RecordTV telenovelas
2013 Brazilian television series debuts
2013 Brazilian television series endings
Portuguese-language telenovelas
Television series based on plays